Seán O'Donoghue (born 25 January 1996) is an Irish hurler who plays as a right corner-back for club side Inniscarra, divisional side Muskerry and at inter-county level with the Cork senior hurling team.

Playing career

College

O'Donoghue first came to prominence as a dual player with Coláiste Choilm in Ballincollig. Having played both codes at every grade, he was a centre-forward on the college's senior Gaelic football team. On 12 April 2014, he scored two points as Coláiste Choilm defeated Scoil Aodháin by 1-11 to 1-10 to take the All-Ireland title in the second tier Drummond Cup.

Club

O'Donoghue joined the Inniscarra club at a young age and played in all grades at juvenile and underage levels. He has also been selected for divisional side Muskerry in the senior championship.

Inter-county

Minor and under-21

O'Donoghue first played for Cork at minor level in 2014. A dual player with both the hurlers and Gaelic footballers, his season ultimately ended without success with defeats by Limerick and Dublin. O'Donoghue was subsequently a dual player at under-21 level and won a Munster medal with the Gaelic football team in 2016. On 30 April 2016, he lined out in the All-Ireland final, however, Cork were defeated by Mayo by 5-07 to 1-14. O'Donoghue was appointed captain of the Cork under-21 football team in 2017.

Senior

O'Donoghue made his senior debut for Cork on 10 January 2015 when he played at left corner-back in a Waterford Crystal Cup against the University of Limerick. He played a number of games during the pre-season tournament but was not included on Cork's league or championship panels. O'Donoghue was recalled to the Cork panel in April 2016, however, he played no part in Cork's subsequent championship campaign and was not included on the panel in 2017. He made his first National League start in a three-point defeat of Kilkenny on 27 January 2018 before making his championship debut on 20 May 2018 in a 2-23 to 1-21 defeat of Clare. On 1 July 2018, O'Donoghue won his first Munster medal following a 2-24 to 3-19 defeat of Clare in the final.

Career statistics

Honours

Coláiste Choilm
All-Ireland Colleges Senior B Football Championship (1): 2014

Cork
Munster Senior Hurling Championship (1): 2018
Munster Under-21 Football Championship (1): 2016

References

External link

Seán O'Donoghue profile at the Cork GAA website

1996 births
Living people
Inniscarra hurlers
Inniscarra Gaelic footballers
Muskerry hurlers
Muskerry Gaelic footballers
Cork inter-county hurlers
Cork inter-county Gaelic footballers
Dual players